Aleksandra Ziółkowska-Boehm (born 15 April 1949, in Łódź, Poland), is a Polish-born U.S.-based writer and academic. She obtained her Ph.D in Humanistic studies at the Warsaw University. Her works include historical biographies, the current outlook of Native Americans, autobiographical stories of her travels, Ingrid Bergman, and cats.

Biography
Ziółkowska-Boehm is the daughter of Henryk Ziółkowski (1916–1992) and Antonina (née Laśkiewicz; 1922–2009). She has two brothers, Henryk (born 1946) and Krzysztof (born 1950).

She attended the V Liceum ogólnokształcące im. W.Reymonta in her native Łódź. After this she studied five years of Polish language and literature at the University of Łódź. After her Master's degree, she completed a Ph.D in humanistic studies in Warsaw University. As a university student, she published her short stories and articles in Łódź and Warsaw newspapers and periodicals. She began her writing career as an assistant to Melchior Wańkowicz, a prominent Polish writer. 
For her help and research with his latest book, Wańkowicz dedicated that book to her, and in his will, he bequeathed all his archives to her. 
In the years 1977-1981 she was a member of the Repertoire of the Polish Television Theater. She created the scenario for 2 Korpus w piosenkach Ref-Rena, a musical, for Warsaw TV in 1991. She appeared in four documentaries dedicated to: Zbigniew Brzezinski, Stanley Haidasz, Melchior Wańkowicz, and her own uncle Korczak Ziółkowski. From 1981–83, she resided in Toronto, Ontario, Canada as the recipient of three writing scholarships. Since April 1990, she has lived permanently in the United States, in Wilmington, Delaware, spending nine  years in Texas (Houston and Dallas).

Personal life
She has one son, Thomas Tomczyk who is a journalist, photographer, architect, founder of Bay Islands Voice, Motmot Magazine and PAYA Magazine, and author of Roatan Magic Hidden Jewel of the Western Caribbean, . Since 1990 she had been married to Norman Boehm (cousin of Ingrid Bergman, retiree of the Arabian American Oil Company and Exxon Mobil Corporation. He died in 2016); author: From a Small Town to the Big World (Foreword: Aleksandra Ziolkowska-Boehm), .

Education and professional memberships
 Master's Degree in Literature from the University of Łódź (1973)
 Doctor's Degree in Humanities from the University of Warsaw (1979)

Affiliations
Ziolkowska-Boehm is a member of a number of professional associations in Poland, the United Kingdom and the United States, including:

 Polish Writers Association Stowarzyszenie Pisarzy Polskich, SPP (Warsaw; 1990- )
 ZAIKS, Polish Society of Authors and Composers (Warsaw; 1976-)
 Zwiazek Pisarzy Polskich Na Obczyznie/Polish Writers Union Abroad, ZPPnO (London; 1990-)
 Polish American Historical Association (Central Connecticut State University, New Britain, CT; 2012-)
 Józef Piłsudski Institute of America (New York; 2012-)
 Polish Heritage Society of Philadelphia (2019-)
 Kosciuszko Foundation (New York; 1990- )
 Polish Institute of Arts and Sciences of America (New York; 1991- )
 PEN America (New York; 1998-)
 Fulbright Association (Washington D.C.; 2007-)

Awards
She is a recipient of numerous literary awards and scholarships:
 Oxford Language Center in England (1975)
 Canadian Polish Research Institute (1982)
 Adam Mickiewicz Foundation (Toronto, 1983)
 Ministry of Culture (Ontario) (1983)
 Institute of International Education in Washington, DC (1985)
 The Kosciuszko Foundation (NYC; 1990) 
 Recipient Kontrasty award (Warsaw-Bialystok 1980) 
 Zloty Exlibris award Ksiaznica Pomorska, Szczecin (2001) 
 The Union of Polish Writers Abroad, London award (2007) 
 Fellowship in literature by the Delaware Division of Arts - ("for Artistic Excellence in Creative Nonfiction")(2006) 
 Fulbright scholarship (2006–07), and award (2008)
 Ignacy Paderewski medal by the Polish Army Veterans Association of America /SWAP/, (2014)
 Gold Cross of Merit (June 20, 2014)
 Gold Award by the Polish Booksellers Association (Warsaw, October 20, 2014)
 Skalny Civic Achievement Award, The Polish American Historical Association (PAHA), Central Connecticut State University, New Britain, CT. (2014)
 Honorary citizenship of the Gmina Sławno, Łódź Voivodeship (2014)
 Gloria Artis award (Warsaw, 2015)
 Turzanski Foundation Literary Award, Toronto, Ontario, Canada (2015)
 Polish Heritage Society of Philadelphia Award (“in recognition for outstanding literary achievements”), (2018)
 Polish Armenian Culture and Heritage Foundation - Expressions of Recognition and Admiration (Warsaw, 2019)
 Witness to History /Świadek Historii/ award (“in recognition of the special merits in commemorating the History of the Polish Nation”; IPN- Institute of   National Remembrance, Warsaw 2019)
 Albert Nelson Marquis Lifetime Achievement Award by Marquis Who's Who (2020) 
 Outstanding Pole Abroad Award (New York 2020; Pangea Network USA, Polish Promotional Emblem Foundation „Teraz Polska”)
 Title of “VIP Alumni of University of Lodz”, 2021
 The Janusz Kurtyka Award for the books promoting Polish history (2022)

Works
In Poland: 
Blisko Wańkowicza (Near Wańkowicz ); Wyd. Literackie Kraków 1975, 1978, 1988;  
Z miejsca na miejsce (From One Place to Another ); Kraków 1983, Warsaw 1986, 1997; ; ; 
Kanada, Kanada (Canada, Canada... ); Warsaw 1986;  
Diecezja Łódzka i jej biskupi (Diocese in Łódź and its bishops ); Łódź 1987;  
Moje i zasłyszane (Mine and Overheard Stories ); Warsaw 1988; 
Kanadyjski senator (Canadian Senator); Warsaw 1989;  
Na tropach Wańkowicza (On Wańkowicz Footsteps ); Warsaw 1989, 1999; ; ; Expanded Edition: Na tropach Wańkowicza po latach (In Wańkowicz's Footsteps - After the Years ); Warsaw 2009; 
 M.Wańkowicza 1964 (The Trial of M. Wańkowicz 1964 ); Warsaw 1990;  
Nie tylko Ameryka (Not only America ); Dom Ksiazki, Warsaw 1992;  
Korzenie sa polskie (The Roots Are Polish ); Warsaw 1992;  
Ulica Żółwiego Strumienia (Turtle Creek Boulevard ); Dom Ksiazki, Warsaw 1995, Wyd. Twoj Styl 2004; ; 
Amerykanie z wyboru i inni (American by Choice ); Dom Ksiazki, Warsaw 1998;  
Podróże z moją kotką (Travels with My Cat ); Warsaw 2002, 2004; ;  (awarded "Book of the Year" by Polish bookstores (23–29 December 2002)).
Nie minelo nic, procz lat (Nothing Changed, Only the Years Passed by ); Warsaw 2003 With Szymon Kobyliński;  
The Union of Polish Writers Abroad (London)  awarded it as the best book of the year in 2007. 
Otwarta rana  Ameryki (America's Open Wound ); Bielsko Biała 2007;  
Dwór w Kraśnicy i Hubalowy Demon (The Krasnica Estate and Hubal's Demon ); PIW Warsaw 2009, 2015; . For the book, she received honorary citizenship of County Slawno.  
Lepszy dzien nie przyszedl juz (A Better Day Has Not Come Yet ); Iskry, Warsaw 2012; 
Ingrid Bergman prywatnie (Ingrid Bergman In Private ); Prószynski i S-ka, Warsaw 2013; 
 Druga bitwa o Monte Cassino i inne opowiesci, (Second Battle of Monte Cassino and other stories); Iskry, Warsaw 2014,  
 Wokół Wańkowicza (Around Wankowicz); Warsaw PIW 2019, 
 Pisarskie delicje (Writing Delicious); Warsaw Bellona 2019, 

In CANADA:
Senator Haidasz (Toronto 1983)
Dreams and Reality Polish Canadian Identities (Toronto 1984)
The Roots Are Polish (Toronto 2000, 2004). Introduction: Major General Bruce J.Legge
 Senator Stanley Haidasz A Statesman for All Canadians (Montreal 2014).

In USA:
Open Wounds - A Native American Heritage (Nemsi Books, Pierpont, S. D. 2009). Foreword: Radoslaw Palonka. 
On the Road With Suzy From Cat to Companion (2010 by Purdue University Press, West Lafayette, Indiana) 
Kaia Heroine of the 1944 Warsaw Rising (Lanham, MD: Lexington Books, 2012), 2014, . Foreword: Bruce E. Johansen. 
 The Polish Experience Through World War II: A Better Day Has Not Come (Lanham MD: Lexington Books, 2013), 2015,  . Foreword: Neal Pease. 
 Melchior Wańkowicz Poland's Master of the Written Word (Lanham MD: Lexington Books, 2013). Foreword: Charles S. Kraszewski.;. 2017, 
 Polish Hero Roman Rodziewicz Fate of a Hubal Soldier in Auschwitz, Buchenwald, and Postwar England (Lanham, MD: Lexington Books, 2013). Foreword: Matt DeLaMater; 2017,  
 Ingrid Bergman and Her American Relatives (Lanham, MD: Hamilton Books, 2013).
Love for Family, Friends, and Books (Lanham, MD: Hamilton Books, 2015),
 Untold Stories of Polish Heroes From World War II (Lanham, MD: Hamilton Books, 2018), Foreword : James S. Pula, ;
.

The chapter of "Kaia Heroine of the 1944 Warsaw Rising" (title: "NKVD Camp No. 41 in Ostashkov") appeared in the Ukrainian translation in the magazine "Журнал Київ" nr 11–12, 2018, translated by Teodozja Zariwna. Excerpts from the book "The Polish Experience Through World War II: A Better Day Has Not Come” appeared in the Ukrainian translation in the magazine ВСЕСВІТ ("Wseswit", Київ/Kyiv), nr 3–4,2020, translated by Valentyna Sobol. Excerpts from the books "Love for Family, Friends and Books”, “Dreams and Reality Polish Canadian Identities”, "Canada, Canada ..." appeared in German in anthology (NORDOST-ARCHIV, Luneburg, Germany / Neue Folge Band VIII )1999, translated by Hans-Christian Trepte. The chapter of the book: "Open Wounds of America" (title: "The Sadness of Reservations") appeared in the Portuguese translation ("A tristeza das reservas") in the academic journal LATINIDADE (11-Numero 2 - Julho-Dezemnro 2019), Rio de Janeiro, Brazil. Translated by Tomasz Łychowski.

References

Sources
James S. Pula, The Polish American Encyclopedia, McFarland, Jefferson, NC 2011, pg 564, 
Who Is Who In Polish America (ed. Boleslaw Wierzbianski). Bicentennial Publishing Corp. New York City 1996, 
Kto jest kim w Polsce (Who Is Who in Poland), Interpress, Warsaw 1989, 
International Who's Who of Intellectuals, Cambridge, England 1999–2000, 
 Five Thousand Personalities of the World, Raleigh, North Carolina 1992,   
 Polscy pisarze współcześni (Polish Contemporary Writers), (ed. Lesław Bartelski), Warsaw 1995, 
 Agata i Zbigniew Judyccy: Polonia. Słownik biograficzny, Warsaw: Wydawnictwo Naukowe PWN, 2000, 
 Encyklopedia polskiej emigracji (ed. Kazimierz Dopierala), Volume 5, Oficyna Wydawnicza Kucharski Toruñ 2005, pp.425–26, 
Wielka Encyklopedia Polonii Swiata (ed. Professor Zbigniew Piasek. In English and Polish). Instytut Edukacji i Rozwoju w Częstochowie oraz Wydawnictwo Akademii Polonijnej Educator, Częstochowa, 2014, pp. 371-373, 
 Encyclopaedia of World Polonia Heritage Ambassadors of World Polonia. Edited by Zbigniew S. Piasek, Wydawnictwo Politechniki Krakowskiej, Krakow 2020. 
Marquis Who’s Who in the East, New Providence, NJ, 1998 (USA, since 27th edition) 
Marquis Who’s Who in the World 2000, New Providence, NJ. (USA, since 17th edition) 
Marquis Who’s Who in America, New Providence, NJ (USA, since 54th edition) 
Marquis Who’s Who of American Women, New Providence, NJ (USA, since 22nd edition) 
 Contemporary Writers of Poland (ed. Danuta Blaszak), 2005,  
 Krzysztof Narutowicz / Alicja Grajewska, Konstelacje, IW PAX, Warsaw 1980, pp. 142–50; 
 Krzysztof Maslon, Nie uciec nam od losu, Prószynski i S-ka, Warsaw 2006, pp. 29–37; 
 Jan Nowak-Jezioranski, Poland's Road to NATO, Towarzystwo Przyjaciól Ossolineum, Wroclaw 2006; 

1949 births
Polish women writers
Polish academics
Living people
Polish emigrants to the United States
Writers from Łódź
Recipients of the Gold Cross of Merit (Poland)
American women writers
People from Wilmington, Delaware
Writers from Wilmington, Delaware
PEN International
Writers from Delaware
Writers from Texas
University of Łódź alumni
Polish women academics
American women academics
University of Warsaw alumni
21st-century American women
Fulbright alumni